The following is a list of mayors of Burlington, Vermont. The 42nd and current mayor is Miro Weinberger, elected in 2012. Mayoral elections in Burlington have been held every three years since 2003. The most recent election was in 2021.

List

References

 List
Burlington